Zaragoza is a town, with a population of 11,176 (2018 census), and a municipality in the Chimaltenango department of Guatemala.

History

The early name of the valley where Zaragoza is located was Chicaj, which evolved into Chicoj or Chixoc, which in kakchiquel means "Francisco Oj", who was the kakchikel chief who owner the land in 1711. It was also known as the "Peach Valley". In 1761 several Spanish families wanted to move to that place and commissioned several members to get government approval; once the permission was granted, the villa was called "Valle de Nuestra Señora del Pilar de Heredia" (English:"Our Lady of the Pond of Heredia Valley)".

One of the earliest references to the town during the Spanish Colony can be found in Compendio de la Historia de la Ciudad de Guatemala (English:Brief account of Guatemala City history) who in 1818 wrote Domingo Juarros.  He pointed out that the Spanish villa belong to Patzicía's "curato" in the mayor municipality of Chimaltenango.

After the independence of Central America in 1821, the Constitution of the State of Guatemala from 11 October 1825, specified the town in the territory, and the villa appeared in Circuit #8 (Sacatepéquez), within Chimaltenango and then, by the Constitutional Assembly of 1839, the town was assigned to Chimaltenango Department. Finally, by an executive action of 27 January 1892, the town was elevated to municipality, and its name was changed to "Zaragoza" because most of the Spanish people who lived there was from Zaragoza, Spain.

In 1895 British archeologist Alfred Percival Maudslay and his wife, Anne Cary Maudslay, visited Zaragoza on their way from Antigua Guatemala to Santiago Atitlán.  Anne Maudslay told her adventure in the book A glimpse at Guatemala, from the Victorian Era perspective: "After riding a mile or two along a road bordered by cottages bosomed in fruit trees we rose to a bleak tableland.  It was one of the very few days of unpleasant weather which we experience during the whole of our journey; a fierce wind raised clouds of dust and rustled through the ugly dry rastrojos, or stubbles of Indian corn, which covered the plain. We passed through the little Indian town of Zaragoza, chiefly noted for the manufacture of aparejos, the native pack-saddles.  I have been told that the Indians here have such a liking for dried alligator meat as a Lenten fare that the vendors of the highly-perfumed delicacy have to be locked up in the carcel (English: Jail for protection and sell the meat through the prison bars.  The streets were full of gaily-dressed people assembled for a fiesta, and dancing was going on in a shed, to a monotonous sound of a marimba.  We were not tempted to loiter for long, and rode on again over the dull plan to uninteresting town of Chimaltenango."

Administrative division

Tourism and recreation 

The following is the list of the main celebrations in the municipality:

Climate

Zaragoza has a subtropical highland climate (Köppen: Cwb).

Winds speed average is 13,5 km/h between January and June, and of 25 km/h between July and December, while the daily sun light average is 6,6 h.

Geographic location

Located in the middle of Chimaltenango Department with an area of 49.1 km². It is completely surrounded by Chimaltenango municipalities:

Sister cities
 Zaragoza, Spain

See also

Notes and references

References

Bibliography

External links
 (in Spanish) La Villa de Zaragoza y toda su historia

Municipalities of the Chimaltenango Department